Cadlina modesta, common name the modest cadlina, is a species of sea slug or dorid nudibranch, a marine gastropod mollusc in the family Cadlinidae.

Distribution
This species was described from Point Pinos, California. It is reported from Point Lena, Juneau, Alaska to Isla Guadalupe, Baja California, Mexico.

Description
The size of the body attains 35 mm.

References

Cadlinidae
Gastropods described in 1966